The 2015 Cork Junior Hurling Championship was the 118th staging of the Cork Junior Hurling Championship since its establishment by the Cork County Board in 1895. The championship began on 13 September 2015 and ended on 30 October 2015.

On 30 October 2015, Dungourney won the championship following a 1-21 to 0-11 defeat of Cloughduv in a replay of the final. This was their first championship title in the grade.

Qualification

Results

Bracket

First round

Semi-finals

Final

Championship statistics

Top scorers

Overall

In a single game

References

External link
 2015 JAHC results

Cork Junior Hurling Championship
Cork Junior Hurling Championship